Dino Hamidović (born 11 July 1996) is a Bosnian handball player for RK Trimo Trebnje and the Bosnian national team.

He represented Bosnia and Herzegovina at the 2020 European Men's Handball Championship.

References

1996 births
Living people
Bosnia and Herzegovina male handball players
Expatriate handball players
Bosnia and Herzegovina expatriate sportspeople in Slovenia
People from Gračanica, Bosnia and Herzegovina